Joseph Tong Changping (born December 6, 1968) is a Chinese Catholic priest and Bishop of the  since 2002.

Biography
Tong was born on December 6, 1968 in Shaanxi. From 1991 to 1994, he studied theology and philosophy at the Seminary of Xi'an Archdiocese. He continued to study law and political science at Shaanxi Academy of Political Science. On January 6, 1997, he was ordained a priest when he was 29 years old. After being ordained, he became professor of law at the diocesan seminary. On November 4, 2002, he was ordained a bishop by Bishop Lawrence Zhang Wenbin. His episcopal ordination was held in December 2003.

References

1968 births
Living people
21st-century Roman Catholic bishops in China
People from Shaanxi